Erionota hiraca is a species of Indomalayan butterfly in the family Hesperiidae. It is found in  Burma, Thailand, N.Vietnam, Malaysia, Singapore, Borneo, Nias, Batoe, Sipora, Java, Bali, Lombok and Sulawesi.

References

Hesperiidae
Butterflies described in 1881
Butterflies of Asia